Francis Patrick Gomez (17 August 1878 – 17 March 1954) was an Australian rules footballer who played with Carlton in the Victorian Football League (VFL).
		
His son, Frank Gomez Jr., played for Essendon in the late 1920s.

Notes

External links 

Frank Gomez's profile at Blueseum
 

1878 births
1954 deaths
Australian rules footballers from Victoria (Australia)
Carlton Football Club players